Parachrostia kishidai is a moth of the family Erebidae first described by Michael Fibiger in 2008. It is known from Amami Ōshima, an island southwest of Japan.

Adults have been found in August and October, but probably occur in several generations.

The wingspan is 11-12.5 mm. The forewing is relatively broad, with a bright, ovoid, yellow reniform stigma. The crosslines are all present, black and waved. The terminal line is marked by tight black interveinal spots. The hindwing is grey, with an indistinct discal spot. The underside of the forewing is brownish and without a pattern. The underside of the hindwing is brownish, with a discal spot.

References

Micronoctuini
Taxa named by Michael Fibiger
Moths described in 2008